Mario Kovač may refer to:

 Mario Kovač (artist) (born 1975), Croatian theatre and movie director
 Mario Kovač (scientist), Croatian computer engineering professor and inventor
 Mario Kovač (politician), Croatian politician, see Cabinet of Ivica Račan I